Badacsonytördemic is a small village in  Veszprém county, Hungary. Between the Badacsony hill and the lake Balaton, the scenery is stunning. It is one out of four Badacsony villages, and the least populous after Badacsonylábdihegy.
In the village centre you can find two shops, (a co-op and a small independent shop) both selling all the basics you need.
There is also a doctor's surgery, a nursery and a church. On the Romai road you can find some apartments to stay in during the Summer, and there is a small pub where you can find food, drinks and ice cream. On the hill there is a car repair, and some wine cellars. At the edge of the village there is a small train station, Badacsonytördemic-Szigliget.
Badacsonytördemic does not have a beach, as it's not actually on the shore, but both Szigliget and Badacsonylábdihegy beaches are nearby.

References

External links 
 Street map (Hungarian)

Populated places in Veszprém County